Casalincontrada (Abruzzese:) is a comune and town in the province of Chieti in the Abruzzo region of central Italy.

It was founded in the 13th century by Frederick II of Hohenstaufen.

Sights include the church of Santo Stefano protomartire (14th century, later renovated in Baroque style), the church of Santa Maria delle Grazie (16th century) and the city gate (14th century).

References

Cities and towns in Abruzzo